Wickstead is a surname. Notable people with the surname include:

 Archibald Wickstead (1884–1966), English cricketer
 Emilia Wickstead (born 1983), New Zealand-born fashion designer in London
 Jemima Kindersley (née Jemima Wickstead; 1741–1809), English travel writer

See also
 Wicksteed (disambiguation)

English-language surnames